Ronnie Jerome Ghent (born January 5, 1980) is a former American football fullback and former head coach of the Central Florida Jaguars of American Indoor Football (AIF). He was signed by the Philadelphia Eagles as an undrafted free agent in 2004. He played college football at Louisville.

Ghent has also been a member of the Cincinnati Bengals,  New Orleans Saints, New York Sentinels and Hartford Colonials.

Early years
Ghent attended Lakeland Senior High School in Lakeland, Florida and was a letterman in football, basketball, and track. In football, he was a three-year letterman and as a senior, he was named as a first-team All-Polk County selection by the Tampa Tribune. Ghent graduated in 1999.

Coaching career
On November 24, 2015, it was announced that Ghent would return to his hometown of Lakeland to serve as the inaugural head coach for the Central Florida Jaguars of American Indoor Football.

References

External links

Louisville Cardinals bio

1980 births
Living people
Sportspeople from Lakeland, Florida
Players of American football from Florida
American football tight ends
Louisville Cardinals football players
Philadelphia Eagles players
Cincinnati Bengals players
New Orleans Saints players
New York Sentinels players
Hartford Colonials players
Orlando Predators players